Dr. Béla Merkely (born 28 June 1966) is a Hungarian interventional cardiologist and sports cardiologist, a university professor, director of Semmelweis University's Heart and Vascular Centre and the current rector of Semmelweis University since 1 July 2018.

Career 
Béla Merkely obtained his medical degree with summa cum laude honours in 1991 at Semmelweis University's Faculty of Medicine in Budapest, Hungary. After graduation, he continued his studies at the third Department of Internal Medicine at Ruprecht-Karls University of Heidelberg, Germany as a DAAD Fellow.

He became board certified in cardiology in 1998 and obtained his PhD in ventricular arrhythmias in 1999. He also holds a Transthoracic Echocardiography (TTE) Certification and was the first Hungarian clinical cardiac electrophysiologist to earn the Cardiac Pacing and Implantable Cardioverter Defibrillators Certification issued by the European Heart Rhythm Association (EHRA). In 2006, he became a Doctor of the Hungarian Academy of Sciences (DSc).

Since 2007, he has been chairman and director of Semmelweis University's heart and vascular centre. The following year, he was promoted to Professor at Semmelweis University. In 2015, Merkely became president of Semmelweis University's Hospital and vice-rector for Clinical Affairs. In 2018, he was appointed Rector of Semmelweis University.

Merkely is the Honorary President of the Hungarian Society of Cardiology, Honorary President and former President of the Hungarian Heart Rhythm Association, former President of the Hungarian Association of Percutaneous Cardiovascular Intervention, and President of the Cardiology Section of the Professional College.
Merkely has held functions in the different bodies and associations of the European Society of Cardiology (ESC) for more than 20 years. Between 2014 and 2016 he was Councillor, between 2016 and 2018 he was vice-president of the ESC. He is also a Fellow of the American College of Cardiology (ACC).

Since 2020, following the outbreak of the COVID-19 pandemic, Merkely has been the Chair of the Clinical Epidemiology Working Group of the four Hungarian Medical Universities and also the chair of the Epidemiology Committee of Semmelweis University.

Research and scientific work 
His major research interests are the non-pharmacological treatment of heart failure; new techniques in interventional cardiology; invasive and non-invasive imaging in heart failure; arrhythmias and acute coronary syndromes; sport cardiology, cardiac remodelling of elite athletes. Since 1994, he has been principal investigator of 15 research projects funded by research grants. His papers are published in a range of Hungarian and international scientific journals. He is the editor-in-chief of the Hungarian journal Orvosképzés, vice editor-in-chief of Interventional Medicine & Applied Science and is the member of the editorial boards of Cor et Vasa, the Journal of Cardiovascular Emergencies, Journal of Hungarian Interdisciplinary Medicine, Frontiers in Cardiovascular Medicine, Advances in Interventional Cardiology, World Journal of Cardiology and Clinical Research in Cardiology.

He has authored and co-authored five books, 44 book chapters, has contributed to 14 university coursebook chapters and two university textbooks, and has signed over 650 articles in international and Hungarian medical journals. His cumulative impact factor is 2194,01, the number of his independent citations is 20.333. (As of 20 May 2019.)

He is a regular speaker at Hungarian and international scientific conferences, such as the World Congress of Cardiology, EUROPACE-Cardiostim, EUROPCR and others organised by the American Heart Association, the World Heart Federation, and the American College of Cardiology.

Scientific degrees 

 2011  Fellow of the American College of Cardiology (FACC)
 2006  Doctor of the Hungarian Academy of Sciences (DSc)  ”Pathomechanisms of tachyarrhythmias and novel non-pharmacological treatment strategies”
 2006  Med. Habil Semmelweis University (Cardiology)
 2001  Fellow of the European Society of Cardiology (FESC)
 1999  Ph.D.  ”Experimental and clinical investigations of ventricular arrhythmias.”

Awards 

 2021 Lions Fair Play Award, for his decade-long participation in goodwill services
 2021 Széchenyi Prize, for the outstanding contribution to the academic life in Hungary
 2021 Man of the Year 2020, award of the “Figyelő” business weekly  
 2018 ESC Silver Medal
 2017 Honorary President of the Hungarian Society of Cardiology  
 2016 Order of Merit of the Hungarian Republic, Commander Cross
 2015 Dénes Gábor Award
 2014 Astellas Certificate of Merit for the outstanding professional knowledge and magnificent human attitude, Physician of the Year Competition
 2014 Gold Medal of Hungarian Society of Cardiology
 2013 Honorary Citizen of Budapest
 2012 Elite Reviewer in Europace
 2011 “FIFA Medical Centre of Excellence” title to the Heart and Vascular Center of Semmelweis University
 2011 Order of Merit of the Hungarian Republic, Officer's Cross
 2009 Nivou Prize of the Hungarian Academy of Sciences
 2006 Pro Civitate Sana Award
 2002 Tutor Award of Semmelweis University's Students’ Scientific Association
 1999 International Virchow Award for the first place at the 10th World Congress of Electrophysiology

References

External links
List of Dr. Béla Merkely's publications in the Hungarian Database of Scientific Works

1966 births
Living people
Hungarian cardiologists
Semmelweis University alumni
Academic staff of Semmelweis University